The East Zone women's cricket team is a women's cricket team that represents East India in the Women's Senior Inter Zonal One Day and Women's Senior Inter Zonal T20. It is a composite team of players from five teams from eastern India: Assam, Bengal, Jharkhand, Odisha and Tripura. They were formed in 1974–75 to play in the Rani Jhansi Trophy, which they competed in until 2002–03, when the competition ended. They then competed in the Inter Zone Women's One Day Competition, and then in the Inter Zone Women's Three Day Competition, which they finished as runners-up in twice.

History
East Zone Women first played in the Rani Jhansi Trophy in the 1974–75 season, a List A competition. They competed in the tournament until it was dissolved after the 2002–03 season, but full results for the trophy are not recorded. They also played matches against the touring New Zealand side in 1975–76 and 1984–85.

In 2007, East Zone began playing in the Inter Zone Women's One Day Competition, which they competed in between the 2006–07 season until it ended after the 2013–14 season. Their best finish in the tournament came in 2010–11, finishing 3rd with two wins from their four matches.

In the 2014–15 season, the zonal teams began competing in a two-day competition, the Inter Zone Women's Two Day Competition. In the first season, East Zone finished as runners-up, with two drawn games won on first innings from their four matches. The side again finished as runners-up in 2015–16, when the tournament became a three-day competition, with three drawn games won on first innings. In 2016–17 the side finished fourth and in 2017–18 East Zone finished bottom of the five team league.

In 2022–23, zonal cricket in India returned, in the form of the Women's Senior Inter Zonal T20. They finished fifth out of sixth teams in the first edition of the tournament. In February 2023, the 2022–23 Women's Senior Inter Zonal One Day tournament took place, in which they finished third in the group stage.

Players

Current squad
Based on squad announced for the 2022–23 season. Players in bold have international caps.

Seasons

Inter Zone Women's Three Day Competition

Women's Senior Inter Zonal T20

Women's Senior Inter Zonal One Day

Honours
 Inter Zone Women's One Day Competition:
 Winners (0):
 Best finish: 3rd (2010–11)
 Senior Women's Cricket Inter Zonal Three Day Game:
 Winners (0):
 Best finish: Runners-up (2014–15 & 2015–16)
 Women's Senior Inter Zonal T20:
 Winners (0):
 Best finish: 5th (2022–23)
 Women's Senior Inter Zonal One Day:
 Winners (0):
 Best finish: 3rd (2022–23)

References

External links 
 East Zone at CricketArchive

Indian women's first-class cricket teams